Garth Webb Secondary School is a school in western Oakville, Ontario for students in grades 9–12. It serves the communities of West Oak Trails and Bronte Creek. The school is named after D-Day veteran Garth Webb who founded the Juno Beach Centre.

Layout
Garth Webb Secondary has 3 floors, each holding a few subjects. The first floor has all the Technology courses, Physical Education, as well as Drama and Music courses. The second floor has Languages, Social Studies and Humanities, Visual Arts and Photography, and Canadian and World studies. The third floor has Mathematics and Sciences.

References

External links

 

High schools in Oakville, Ontario
2012 establishments in Ontario
Educational institutions established in 2012